The Dean of Exeter is the head of the Chapter of Cathedral Church of Saint Peter in Exeter, England. The chapter was established by William Briwere, Bishop of Exeter (1224–44) who set up the offices of dean and chancellor of Exeter Cathedral, allowing the chapter to elect those officers. The deanery is at 10 The Close, Exeter. The current dean is Jonathan Greener.

List of deans

High Medieval
1225–1231 Serlo
1231–1252 Roger de Wynkleigh
1252–1268 William de Stanwey
1268–1274 Roger de Toriz
1274–1280 John Noble
1280–1283 John Pycot
1283–1302 Andrew de Kilkenny

Late Medieval
1302–1307 Henry de Somerset
1307–1309 Thomas de Lechlade
1311–1326 Bartholomew de Sancto Laurentio
1328–1335 Richard de Coleton
1335–1353 Richard de Braylegh
1353–1363 Reginald de Bugwell
1363–1378 Robert Sumpter
1378–1385 Thomas Walkyngton
1385–1415 Ralph Tregrision
1415–1419 Stephen Payn
1419–1457 John Cobethorn
1457–1459 John Hals
1459–1477 Henry Webber
1477–1478 Peter Courtenay
1478–1482 Lionel Woodville
1482–1496 John Arundel

Early modern
1496–1509 Edward Willoughby
1509 Thomas Hobbes
1509–1519 John Vesey
1519–1527 Richard Pace
1527–1537 Reginald Pole
1537–1552 Simon Haynes
1553 James Haddon
1554–1558 Thomas Reynolds
1560–1570 Gregory Dodds
1571–1583 George Carew
1583–1588 Stephen Townesend
1589–1629 Matthew Sutcliffe
1629–1661 William Peterson
1661–1662 Seth Ward
1662–1663 Edward Young
1663–1680 George Cary (1611-1680), of Clovelly
1680–1701 The Hon Richard Annesley, later 3rd Baron Altham
(The Lord Altham from 1700)
1703–1705 William Wake
1705–1717 Lancelot Blackburne
1717–1726 Edward Trelawney
1726–1740 John Gilbert
1741–1742 Alured Clarke
1742–1748 William Holmes
1748–1762 Charles Lyttleton

1762–1784 Jeremiah Milles
1784–1790 William Buller
1790–1802 Charles Harward

Late modern
1803–1809 Charles Talbot
1809–1810 George Gordon
1810–1813 John Garnett
1813–1838 Whittington Landon
1839–1861 Thomas Lowe
1861–1863 Charles Ellicott
1863–1867 The Viscount Midleton
1867–1883 Archibald Boyd
1883–1900 Benjamin Cowie
1900–1918 Alfred Earle
1918–1931 Henry Gamble
1931–1934 Walter Matthews
1935–1950 Spencer Carpenter
1950–1960 Alexander Wallace
1960–1972 Marcus Knight
1973–1980 Clifford Chapman
1981–1995 Richard Eyre
1996–2004 Keith Jones
2005–2011 Jonathan Meyrick
2012–2017 Jonathan Draper
26 November 2017present Jonathan Greener

References

Fasti ecclesiae Anglicanae Vol.1 p.428
Fasti ecclesiae Anglicanae Vol.1 p.429
Fasti ecclesiae Anglicanae Vol.1 p.430
Fasti ecclesiae Anglicanae Vol.1 p.431

 
1225 establishments in England
Diocese of Exeter
Exeter Cathedral
Dean of Exeter